The 1996-97 Four Hills Tournament took place at the four traditional venues of Oberstdorf, Garmisch-Partenkirchen, Innsbruck and Bischofshofen, located in Germany and Austria, between 29 December 1996 and 6 January 1997.

Results

Overall

References

External links 
  

Four Hills Tournament
1996 in ski jumping
1997 in ski jumping
1996 in German sport
1997 in German sport
1997 in Austrian sport